Maoribank is a suburb of Upper Hutt, located 2–3 km east-northeast of the city centre. It was predominantly developed between 1950-1970 and had a population of just less than 1000 at the 2013 Census.

It is located at the base of the Eastern Hutt Valley Hills, on a slight incline. Maoribank can be accessed from SH2 by exiting at either Mangaroa Hill Road or Moeraki Road. It is bordered by Timberlea by following Norana Road up the hill to the northeast, Brown Owl by crossing SH2 next to the Caltex service station, and Clouston Park to the southwest by crossing Mangaroa Hill Road. The Mangaroa Valley can be accessed by traversing Mangaroa Hill Road over the Mangaroa Hill in the Eastern Hutt Valley Hills.

While there are no shops in Maoribank, residents have access to the Caltex service station and small shopping centre in neighbouring Brown Owl. The shops in Central Upper Hutt are only 2 to 3 km away.

Public transport 
Maoribank is serviced by the Te Marua commuter bus route (#112), operated by Metlink.

The Wairarapa Connection train on the Wairarapa Line goes through Maoribank but does not stop; the Maoribank Tunnel under Mount Marua Drive (539 metres or 1,767 feet long)  was built during construction of the Rimutaka Tunnel in 1953–54.

Demographics

Maoribank had a population of 3,318 at the 2018 New Zealand census, an increase of 477 people (16.8%) since the 2013 census, and an increase of 753 people (29.4%) since the 2006 census. There were 1,125 households. There were 1,680 males and 1,635 females, giving a sex ratio of 1.03 males per female. The median age was 35.1 years (compared with 37.4 years nationally), with 738 people (22.2%) aged under 15 years, 675 (20.3%) aged 15 to 29, 1,581 (47.6%) aged 30 to 64, and 321 (9.7%) aged 65 or older.

Ethnicities were 77.6% European/Pākehā, 24.1% Māori, 7.1% Pacific peoples, 7.1% Asian, and 2.7% other ethnicities (totals add to more than 100% since people could identify with multiple ethnicities).

The proportion of people born overseas was 18.2%, compared with 27.1% nationally.

Although some people objected to giving their religion, 55.8% had no religion, 31.6% were Christian, 1.0% were Hindu, 0.3% were Muslim, 0.4% were Buddhist and 4.3% had other religions.

Of those at least 15 years old, 384 (14.9%) people had a bachelor or higher degree, and 483 (18.7%) people had no formal qualifications. The median income was $36,000, compared with $31,800 nationally. The employment status of those at least 15 was that 1,449 (56.2%) people were employed full-time, 342 (13.3%) were part-time, and 129 (5.0%) were unemployed.

Education

The nearest secondary school is Heretaunga College, some 5 km away in Trentham.

References

Further reading
 - Digitised Book Archive item 64/14238 - Upper Hutt City Library.
B Welch, Maoribank - A Local History, circa 1980, Digitised Book Archive item 64/14271 - Upper Hutt City Library.

Suburbs of Upper Hutt